Old Tower Without was an extra-parochial place, usually described as a "precinct", and after 1858 a civil parish in the metropolitan area of London, England.

Old Tower Without was outside the jurisdiction of either the City of London or the County of Middlesex, and was within the Liberty of the Tower which had separate county administration and court of quarter sessions.

It was within the bills of mortality area but did not give returns of burials and baptisms.

It became part of the Whitechapel Poor Law Union in 1837. Under the Metropolis Management Act 1855 it was grouped into the Whitechapel District as the "District of Tower". This was later interpreted to mean it included the extra-parochial place of Great Tower Hill.

In 1889 it became part of the County of London and the Liberty of the Tower was dissolved in 1894. The parish of Old Tower Without was abolished in 1895 and became part of St Botolph without Aldgate.

Population
The population at the decennial census was:

References

Parishes united into districts (Metropolis)
Former civil parishes in London
History of the London Borough of Tower Hamlets